The 2017 Asian Women's Handball Championship was the 16th edition of the Asian Women's Handball Championship, which took place from 13 to 22 March 2017 in Suwon, South Korea. The tournament was held under the aegis of Asian Handball Federation. It was the second time that South Korea hosted the tournament, after the 1995 Championship. It also acted as the Asian qualifying tournament for the 2017 World Women's Handball Championship.

Venues

Draw
The draw was held on 11 January 2017 at the SK Olympic Handball Gymnasium in Seoul, South Korea. Maldives withdrew from the championship after the draw. Vietnam was initially drawn in Group B but was shifted to Group A, to balance number of teams in each group.

Referees
Three male and two female referee pairs were selected for the championship. Bahraini, Jordanian and Iranian pairs were male while the rest of two were female:

Preliminary round
All times are local (UTC+9).

Group A

Group B

Knockout stage

Bracket

5–8th place bracket

5–8th place semifinals

Semifinals

Seventh place game

Fifth place game

Third place game

Final

Final standing

References

External links
Official website 
Results at todor66

2017
2017 in women's handball
2017 in South Korean women's sport
2017 Asian Women's Handball Championship
Sports competitions in Suwon
Asian Women's Handball